A Natural Death is the third studio album by Horse the Band. This is the band's last album with bassist Dashiell Arkenstone and the only one with drummer Chris Prophet.

Overview
Frontman Nathan Winneke states: "A Natural Death is about the futility and arrogance of creation and destruction, the overwhelming scale of space and time, and the brutal majesty of nature, the horror of birth, and the beauty of death. Everyone who will ever live will die a natural death, and will soon after be forgotten for eternity. Hopefully this album will serve as a warning to the human race to stop taking itself so seriously, as we have seen the dire consequences of its actions in the future. You are nothing."

Upon the album's release, "Murder" was frequently played on the Sirius Satellite Radio station, Hard Attack. In 2007, the album peaked at #4 at the Top Heatseekers and at #27 on the Independent Albums charts.

Track listing

Trivia
Originally the song "Crow Town" was on the album as track 10, and "The Red Tornado" was track 9, this was replaced just after the release with "Broken Trail". In the song "Lif" where various fragments of the previous songs are played throughout, you can hear the crows crowing at one point, exactly as they do in the song "Crow Town" furthermore showing it was an original song for the album.
The song "The Red Tornado" refers to the comic book superhero Red Tornado.

Personnel

Horse the Band
Erik Engstrom – keyboards, Game Boy, samples
Nathan Winneke – vocals
David Isen – guitar
Dashiell Han Arkenstone – bass, baritone guitar, organ
Chris Prophet – drums
Production
Brian Virtue – production, engineering, mixing
David Klein – album artwork and layout

References

MNRK Music Group singles
2007 albums
Horse the Band albums